Ali Doraghi (born September 20, 1984)  is an Iranian professional basketball player, currently playing as a center for Petrochimi in the Iranian Basketball Super League. He is also a member of the Iranian national basketball team that won the gold medal at the FIBA Asia Championship 2007 and he competed at the 2008 Olympic Basketball Tournament.

Honours

National team
Asian Championship
Gold medal: 2007, 2009
Asian Games
Bronze medal: 2010
Asian Under-20 Championship
Gold medal: 2004

References

Living people
1984 births
Iranian men's basketball players
Olympic basketball players of Iran
Basketball players at the 2008 Summer Olympics
People from Ahvaz
Asian Games bronze medalists for Iran
Asian Games medalists in basketball
Basketball players at the 2010 Asian Games
Centers (basketball)
Medalists at the 2010 Asian Games
Sportspeople from Khuzestan province